Results from Norwegian football in 1946.

Norwegian Cup

Final

Northern Norwegian Cup

Final

National team

References

   
Seasons in Norwegian football